Cheddleton railway station is a former passenger railway station of the North Staffordshire Railway (NSR) and is now a preserved station on the Churnet Valley Railway in Staffordshire, England].

History
Cheddleton station, situated on the Churnet Valley Line of the NSR, was opened to passengers and goods on 1 September 1849.

The station was a quiet country station serving the needs of nearby Cheddleton village, and for a time, the settlement of Ipstones, which is out of the valley.

As with many stations in the 1960s, levels of traffic decreased to such an extent that the station was considered non-viable and closed to both passengers and goods in 1965.

Churnet Valley Railway early days
During the 1970s a railway preservation base was established at Cheddleton railway station. This was due to a campaign by local people, spearheaded by local businessman and resident Norman Hancock, who in May 1974 as a mark of protest parked his Jaguar car on the level crossing where the railway line meets Basford Bridge Lane in Cheddleton. Following his actions and with support from a local campaign the station building was saved from demolition and became a grade II listed building on 14 May 1974. Cheddleton Station later became the base of the Churnet Valley Railway and has a commemorative plaque dedicated to Hancock on the wall.

Initially, there was a railway museum displaying artefacts relating to the North Staffordshire Railway. In 1978 the NSRS became the North Staffordshire Railway Co. (1978) Ltd, and it became a charity in 1983.

Later the bay platform area was acquired in 1984 and a former NSR signal box was put into use. The Churnet Valley line finally closed for sand traffic in 1988 and the NSRC jumped at the chance to purchase the line from British Rail by publicising its share prospectus.

Later developments 
Since the first trains ran in 1996 the CVR has grown with Cheddleton remaining its headquarters. The station area has benefited from temporary buildings on the opposite side to the original, housing a shop and tea room. The yard to the south of the platforms has progressively expanded with several roads, an inspection pit, and carriage shed being some of the facilities now in use as well as the main engine shed that was built early on. Recently the second platform has been reconnected to the main line by means of a siding which will one day form a loop to pass trains on.

Cheddleton tunnel 

See also
Listed buildings in Cheddleton

Route

References

External links

Churnet Valley Railway Cheddleton Homepage

Heritage railway stations in Staffordshire
Railway stations in Great Britain opened in 1849
Railway stations in Great Britain closed in 1965
Former North Staffordshire Railway stations
Grade II listed railway stations
Grade II listed buildings in Staffordshire
Beeching closures in England
1849 establishments in England